There are 80,000 netball players in Singapore. playing several variations of netball, including beach netball. Sport Singapore (formerly known as Singapore Sports Council) is responsible for maintaining 8 netball courts. Netball Singapore is the official governing body for the sport in Singapore. It was created in 1962, with 63 registered clubs.

International tournaments
In 1983, the country held the 1983 Netball World Championships. In 2001, Singapore hosted the INFA World Congress. In 2005, the country hosted the Asian Netball Championships. In 2006, Netball Singapore created and hosted the first major Asian netball tournament, The Nations Cup. The 13th World Netball Championships was held in Singapore in 2011.

National team
Singapore has several national squads: Opens, 21 & Under, 19 & Under (Post School), 19 & Under (Schools), 17 & Under, and 14 & Under. The national team competed in its first major tournament in 1967 at the Netball World Championships. Singapore had a national team compete in the fifth Asian Netball Championships held in Colombo, Sri Lanka in 2001. Singapore competed in the 7th Asian Youth Netball Championship held in 2010 in India. As of August 2016, the women's national team was ranked number seventeenth in the world.

Some of the top performances for the Singapore national netball teams include:
 2010 Asian Youth Netball Championship: Third

Professional league
In 2000, the professional Netball Super League (NSL) was established and governed by Netball Singapore. 

The Netball Super League, comprising six teams, is a seven-week-long netball tournament developed to cater for professional netball players in Singapore. In 2004, the audience was big enough that the league was broadcast on television.

References

Bibliography

External links 
Olympic Council of Asia